Esad Bejic (born 3 March 2001) is an Austrian footballer who plays as a centre-back for Austrian club Young Violets, the reserve squad of Austria Wien.

Club career
On 17 July 2021, Bejic was named as a Austria Wien substitute for the first time in a 2021–22 Austrian Cup first round match against SV Spittal. His debut with Austria Wien came on 26 September in an Austrian Bundesliga match against TSV Hartberg after being named in the starting line-up.

International career
Bejic was born in Austria to Albanian parents from Preševo. He from 2016, until 2018 has been part of Austria at youth international level, respectively has been part of the U15, U16 and U17 teams and he with these teams played 25 matches and scored 3 goals.

References

External links

2001 births
Living people
Association football central defenders
Austrian footballers
Austria youth international footballers
Austrian people of Albanian descent
2. Liga (Austria) players
Austrian Football Bundesliga players
FK Austria Wien players